Robert Robinson "Bob" Casey   (January 26, 1859 – November 28, 1936) was a Canadian professional baseball player who played third base in 1882 for the Detroit Wolverines of the National League.

External links

1859 births
19th-century baseball players
1939 deaths
Baseball people from Ontario
Canadian expatriate baseball players in the United States
Detroit Wolverines players
East Saginaw Grays players
Major League Baseball players from Canada
Major League Baseball third basemen
Minneapolis Millers (baseball) players
Syracuse Stars (minor league baseball) players
Burials at Oakwood Cemetery (Syracuse, New York)